Village Syed Matto Shah, also called Saeed Matto, is located in union council Saeed Matto, tehsil Bulri Shah Karim, district Tando Muhammad Khan, Sindh, Pakistan. Due to its historical background, the village is the centre of cultural and financial activities in the surrounding area.

Before independence of Pakistan in 1947, it was populated by Hindus, Muslims and Sikhs. After the independence, the minority Hindus and Sikhs migrated to India while the Muslim refugees from India settled down in Syed Matto Shah.

The existing population of union council Saeed Matto Shah includes Muslim and Hindu tribes, including Kolhis, Sathias, Solangi and Siddis (also Qambranis or Sheedis).

Notable people
Umaid Ali Sathio

Umaid Ali Sathio – a high school teacher (HST) and an author of several books in Sindhi – could not have continued his education if Shams ul Haq Ansari of Hala had not been posted to the village as the secretary of union council Saeed Matto. He offered free tuition to the villagers, including Umaid Ali, and encouraged them to continue their secondary and higher secondary education as private students.

Umaid Ali was one of the villagers who never looked back. He did the matric from Government High School Tando Muhammad Khan, and Master of Education (MEd) from University of Sindh, old campus.

These days, apart from teaching at the Government High School Abdul Rahim Katiar as HST, Umaid Ali is busy in authoring books on the local history and culture. His published books include:
   Sathia Caste (two parts)
   About Syed Paryal Shah Dada Sain and his Ancestry
   Significant Towns of Sindh

References

External links
Tando Muhammad Khan District Map by iMMAP

Populated places in Tando Muhammad Khan District